The Our Lady of Candelaria Parish Church, commonly known as the Silang Church, is a Roman Catholic parish church in the municipality of Silang, in the province of Cavite, Philippines under the Roman Catholic Diocese of Imus. Its titular is the Our Lady of Candelaria (also Our Lady of Candles). The church is known for its Spanish colonial architectural style and the rococo-influenced retablos.  It is the oldest existing stone church in the province of Cavite having completed in 1639.

The church and retablo of the Our Lady of Candelaria Parish was declared a National Cultural Treasure by the National Museum of the Philippines on 3 February 2017.

Church History 
The Franciscans started evangelizing Silang in 1585 with the permission of Fr. Cristobal de Salvatierra. After ten years, the parish was established on February 3, 1595. They built a small chapel made of light materials under the patronage of St. Diego of Alcalá and a small school and took charge of Silang until 1611. Due to the request of an encomendero (grantee of an encomienda), Capt. Diego Jorge de Villalobos to the rector of the Society of Jesus in Manila, the Jesuits were assigned to Silang in May 1599.  The first Jesuits in town was Fr. Diego Sanchez and Fr. Diego de Santiago. The first two Jesuits were followed by Fr. Luis Gomez, Fr. Francisco Almerici, Fr. Pedro Chirino, and Fr. Leonardo Scelsi.  The church and school built by the Franciscans was destroyed by fire on August 30, 1603. With a new order of priests to administer, the church and school previously built by the Franciscans were transferred in a new location and made even larger. The stone church was built from 1637 to 1639 under the auspices of Fr. Juan de Salazar and was dedicated to the Nuestra Senora de Candelaria in 1640. When the Jesuits were expelled from the Spanish colonies, the parish was taken over by the secular clergy in 1788, the Augustinian Recollects in 1849, back to the secular clergy in 1868, Congregation of the Immaculate Heart of Mary (CICM) in 1910, seculars in 1913, Columbans in 1936 and is now administered by the secular clergy since 1978.

Features 
Unlike other Jesuit churches like Antipolo and Tanay built under the auspices of Fr. Salazar, Silang church is a typical baroque church without any elaborate and magnificent ornamentation on its simple façade. Huge stone walls were built to protect the church from bandits. Like its exterior, the interior of Silang is also simple. There are no ornamentation on its pilasters and small windows are placed high on walls. It also has a large wooden church entrance. The lack of magnificence on Silang church was due to the death of Fr. Salazar in 1645 who primarily administered the church construction 

In 1937, the original wooden floor was replaced by red clay tiles. Due to a fire in 1950, the ceiling was replaced one meter away from the original location.

Belfry 
It has a four-story belfry connected to the main church. The first floor is four sided while the rest of the floors are octagonal. The fourth story of the belfry was destroyed in the 1880 earthquake and was only restored to its original height in 1989, after a hundred years.

Retablos or Altarpieces
The retablos of Silang falls under the baroque style and is built from 1643 to 1663. It has three retablo, one retablo mayor or main altar and two side altars or colaterales in each side of the transepts which are mirror images of each other. The side altars have three levels containing relieves except for the central niche of the second story. The first and second level has three niches while the third level has a single niche. Fluted ionic columns and corinthian columns designed the first story and the second and third stories respectively. On top of the altars are statues of angels holding shields. One of the side altar is dedicated to women saints, saints in the New Testaments and martyrs. The other one was dedicated to the Jesuit saints. The presence of local styles such as plants, fruits, volutes or circular designs and millipedes made the retablo of Silang distinct.

The altar mayor is the largest and highest altar among the three altars and known relieves depicting the story of Jesus in the life of Mary based on the mysteries of the Holy Rosary. It has three levels, seven alternating niches for saints and relief and same divisions like the side altars. Instead of fluted Corinthian column separating the retablo sections, garlanded Corinthians and salomonicas are used. The same local styles are also used in the main altar like fruits and flowers including decorative motifs of foliage, angel heads, acanthus crenelations, cartouches and empty rectangle.

The six relieves on the altar mayor are:
 Ang Pagbisita (Visitation of the Angel Gabriel to Mary)
 Ang Panunulúyan (Re-enactment of the journey of St. Joseph and Mary in search for lodging in Bethlehem)
 Ang mga Mago (The Three Kings)
 Ang Presentasyon sa Templo (The Presentation of Jesus at the Temple)
 Ang Koronasyon (The Coronation of Mary)

The seventh relief on the topmost level is a relief of the Santo Niño de Ternate. The image of the Nuestra Señora de Candelaria¸ patroness of Silang is currently located at the central niche of the first level of the altar mayor.

Restorations 
During the 1980s up to the early 1990s, the church had a white interior with hints of gold in the columns, niches, pediments, saints and foliage of the retablo which was done during the 1970s restoration by Talleres de Maximo Vicente through application of varnish. Revarnishing was done in 1989 for preservation. The original pastel color of the retablo was restored in 2002 by carefully removing layers of lacquer, modern varnish, paraffin and soot. In 2004, the golden pillars were restored to beige with a hint of avocado green and its rouge flowers to pink to complement the modern-day adobe wall-cladding. Ceiling height was also restored to its original location. During the 21st century restoration, a statue of St. Paul holding a sword located at the right-most portion of the retablo was stolen. It was never recovered and a replica was used to replace the original statue.

Devotion to the Virgin of Candelaria 
Andres, an indio from Silang discovered a box containing an image of the Blessed Virgin Mary in the mountains of Silang in 1640. Another indio, stunned by the glory of the image requested Andres to give it to him and without hesitation, Andres gave it to the indio. Later on, a tabernacle was built because of the large number of devotees. On January 30, 1643, the indio left the town and forgot about the sacred Friday devotion that he inherited from his ancestors. Upon his return to Silang, the image was not anymore in the tabernacle. He asked for forgiveness, searched for the image and found it. It again disappeared for nine times over the next few years. Upon the advice of the Jesuit rector, he ordered the people to make vigil, bring the image to the church in festive mood. From then on, the image was permanently placed in the retablo of the church of Silang. Until now, the same procession and festive mood is still celebrated in Silang from February 1 to 3 every year that coincides with the feast of the Virgin of Candelaria every February 2.

Notes

Bibliography

External links 

Marked Historical Structures of the Philippines
Roman Catholic churches in Cavite
Churches in the Roman Catholic Diocese of Imus